Robert ÆOLUS Myers was an American composer, performer and producer best known for his cinematic soundscapes incorporating flute, synthesizer, and percussion. These works utilizing western classical and indigenous compositional stylings draw readily from Asian, Arabic, and African influences. He composed four albums — AEOLIAN MELODIES and RAYS, released by Global Pacific Records in conjunction with CBS/Sony Group Inc. and THE MAGICIAN and HIGH PRIESTESS as independent releases. He additionally appeared on multiple album projects and most closely collaborated with musicians Nelson Hiu, Kit Ebersbach, Bob Kindler, Gerardo Maza, and Vima Lamura. ÆOLUS: A Retrospective, a compilation album featuring works from all four albums was produced by Aloha Got Soul Records. A compilation album including several remixes,Talisman, was released via Bandcamp on 26 April 2019.

Robert ÆOLUS Myers has collaborated in performance art, experiential theatre, and modern dance presentations. He has worked with Cheryl Flaharty of Iona Contemporary Dance Theatre, Valerie Bergman of Rainbow Dance Theatre, and Earnest Morgan at Volcano and Kalani Honua Dance retreats. He has also performed with Tashi Leo Lightning. He was artist in residence at Volcano Arts Center on the Big Island of Hawaii, has been the recipient of multiple Meet the Composer grants, performed at Expo '92 in Seville, Spain, and was a participant in the New Music Across America concert series.

Robert has participated in devotional music for over 40 years. He has played harmonium and sung the Cosmic Chants of Yogananda for Self Realization services, drummed for Sufi Dhikrs, played flute and percussion for the Mevlevi Turn, and was a long time inner circle musician for the Dances of Universal Peace as led by Yakzan Hugo Valdez.  Before his death, Robert was playing in support of Kirtan Wallahs.

Robert ÆOLUS Myers held an undergraduate degree in Ethnomusicology from the University of Hawai'i, a master's degree in Counseling Psychology with emphasis in Depth Psychology from Pacifica Graduate Institute, and was an initiate of Sheikh Yakzan Hugo Valdez a student of Pir Vilayat Inayat Khan of the Sufi Order in the West, of Murshid Samuel L. Lewis of Sufi Islamia Ruhaniat Society, and Suleyman Hayati Dede, Sheikh of Konya of the Mevlevi Order.

Discography

Albums
AEOLIAN MELODIES
RAYS
THE MAGICIAN
HIGH PRIESTESS

Compilation albums
ÆOLUS: A Retrospective
Talisman

See also 
List of ambient music artists

Sources
Bill Stone, "'New Age' Musician Stages Concert in Gothic Cathedral," Hawaii Kai/East Oahu Sun Press, 16–22, Oct. 1986.
Cary Smith, "New Age Musicians Find Home Here," Honolulu Star Bulletin, 31 Aug. 1989.
Jay Heartwell, "He Doesn't Need an Orchestra," The Honolulu Advertiser, 7 Nov. 1985.
Mike Gordon, "The New Age of Music," Honolulu Star-Bulletin, 5 Nov. 1987.
Roger Bong, "ÆOLUS: An anthology from Hawaii’s new age visionary, Robert ‘Aeolus’ Myers," Aloha Got Soul blog, 11 Dec. 2016.

References

External links
 Robert ÆOLUS Myers - music site (official site)
 Robert Myers, Psychotherapist - mental health & music site (official site)
 Discogs - Robert ÆOLUS Myers
 Collected Works on SoundCloud

Ambient musicians
New-age musicians
American male composers
21st-century American composers
Living people
University of Hawaiʻi at Mānoa alumni
21st-century American male musicians
Year of birth missing (living people)